The Zemla Intifada (or the Zemla Uprising) is the name used to refer to disturbances of June 17, 1970, which culminated in a massacre (between 2 and 11 persons were killed) by Spanish Legion forces in the Zemla district of El Aaiun, Spanish Sahara (nowadays Western Sahara).

Demonstration
Leaders of the previous secret organization Harakat Tahrir called for a demonstration to read out a petition of goals in response against the Spanish occupation of Western Sahara. On June 17, 1970, this petition was read to the Spanish governor-general of the colony, General José María Pérez de Lema y Tejero, peacefully.

Riot
After the demonstration was being dispersed by orders from Spain's governor-general, police moved in to arrest the Harakat Tahrir'''s leaders. Demonstrators responded to the police's actions by throwing stones at the police. The Spanish authorities called in the Spanish Foreign Legion who opened fire on the demonstrators, killing at least eleven people.

Aftermath
In the days following the incident, the Harakat Tahrir's founder Muhammad Bassiri, and other Harakat Tahrir activists, were hunted down by Spanish security forces. Bassiri disappeared in jail after being arrested in 1970.

The Zemla demonstration led to the end of the Harakat Tahrir''. Hundreds of their supporters were arrested, while other demonstrators were deported from Spanish Sahara. The suppression of the Zemla demonstration pushed the Spanish Saharan anti-colonial movement into embracing armed struggle. The militant nationalist organization Polisario Front was formed three years later.

References

Intifadas
Protests in Western Sahara
Western Sahara conflict
Spanish Sahara
Laayoune
1970 in Spanish Sahara
Conflicts in 1970